Sacheverell (pronounced  ) is a rare English name of Norman French origin meaning "roebuck leap". The diminutive form is "Sachie" or "Sacha". Notable people with the name include:

As a surname
 Henry Sacheverell (1674–1724), English churchman and politician 
 The Sacheverell riots, a 1710 series of riots in response to his prosecution
 Richard Sacheverell (before 1469 – 1534), English politician
 William Sacheverell (1638–1691), English statesman 

As a given or middle name
 Sir Francis Osbert Sacheverell Sitwell, 5th Baronet (1892–1969), English writer, essayist, and poet, known as Osbert
 Sir Sacheverell Sitwell, 6th Baronet (1897–1988), English writer and art and music critic, younger brother of the 5th Baronet
  Sir Sacheverell Reresby Sitwell, 7th Baronet (1927–2009), English landowner and patron of the arts, son of the 6th Baronet, known as Reresby
  Sir George Reresby Sacheverell Sitwell, 8th Baronet (born 1967), English businessman, nephew of the 7th Baronet, known as George
  William Ronald Sacheverell Sitwell (born 1969), English editor and food journalist, younger brother and heir presumptive of the 8th Baronet
 Walter Henry Sacheverell Sitwell (born 2018), son and heir apparent of the heir presumptive of the 8th Baronet